Carlo Fontana (1634/1638–1714) was an Italian architect originating from today's Canton Ticino, who was in part responsible for the classicizing direction taken by Late Baroque Roman architecture.

Biography

There seems to be no proof that he belonged to the family of famous architects of the same name, which included Domenico Fontana. Born in Brusato, near Como (now part of the town of Novazzano in Canton Ticino, Switzerland), Fontana went to Rome before 1655. He became a draughtsman for the architectural plans of Pietro da Cortona, Carlo Rainaldi, and Gian Lorenzo Bernini. Bernini employed him for nearly a decade in diverse projects.

His first independent project may be the church of San Biagio in Campitelli, completed by 1665. His façade at San Marcello al Corso (1682–83) is described as one of his most successful works. For his patron, Innocent XII, he erected the immense building of the Istituto Apostolico San Michele at Ripa Grande, organized around its church; the baptismal chapel at St. Peter's; and slightly modified and finished Palazzo Montecitorio, which had been begun as Bernini's Palazzo Ludovisi, for Niccolò Ludovisi during the reign of the Ludovisi pope Gregory XV, and which he publicized by a Discorso (1694).

At the request of Clement XI he built the public oil deposits (Olearie Papali) within the ruins of the Baths of Diocletian  (currently used for temporary exhibitions), the portico of Santa Maria in Trastevere, and the basin of the fountain of San Pietro in Montorio. He designed the Casanate library at Santa Maria sopra Minerva, designed the ribbed hemispherical dome for the duomo of Montefiascone (completed long after his death) and the casino in the Vatican, and collected all the models of the building.

Fontana mainly worked in Rome, assisted by his nephews Girolamo and Francesco Fontana (1668–1708), but he sent a model for the cathedral of Fulda, and others to Vienna for the royal stables. Among his other foreign works were the designs for a Jesuit complex in Azpeitia, Spain, in the village of Loyola where Saint Ignatius of Loyola, the founder of the Jesuit Order was born. This grandiose basilica was a major influence upon baroque architecture of the New World.

Fontana was an able artist and a good designer, but lacked the innovation that characterized early Baroque architects like Cortona and Borromini. In addition, he was  more successful as an architect than as a writer. By order of Innocent XI he wrote a diffuse historical description of the Templum Vaticanum (1694), which included his project for completing St. Peter's. In this work Fontana advised the demolition of that dense nest of medieval houses called La Spina which formed a sort of island from Ponte Sant' Angelo to the piazza of St. Peter's; the project was completed under Mussolini, creating the Via della Conciliazione. Fontana made a calculation of the whole expense of St. Peter's from the beginning to 1694, which amounted to 46,800,052 crowns, without including models. He also published works on the Colosseum; the Aqueducts; the inundation of the Tiber, etc. Furthermore, twenty seven manuscript volumes of his writings and sketches are preserved in the Royal Library at Windsor.

Fontana was principe of the Accademia di San Luca in 1686 and 1692–1700. Fontana's studio was one of the most prolific in Europe; its designs for fountains, tombs, and altars were often imitated or reproduced abroad. Among Fontana's disciples, who spread his fame throughout Europe, were Giovanni Battista Vaccarini in Sicily, Filippo Juvarra in Italy and Spain, James Gibbs in England, Matthäus Daniel Pöppelmann in Germany, Johann Lucas von Hildebrandt and Fischer von Erlach in Austria, Nicodemus Tessin the Younger in Sweden, and Nicola Michetti in Italy and Russia.
Other Fontana pupils include Giovan Battista Contini and Carlo Francesco Bizzaccheri.

Works in Rome 

Palazzo Giustiniani. Rebuilding and refurbishing, with Francesco Borromini and others
 Santa Maria in Traspontina. Main altar (1674)
Palazzo Montecitorio (1694–97); the headquarters of the Camera dei Deputati of the Italian government since 1871.
Façade of the church of San Marcello al Corso (1682–83). The slightly concave façade with the emphatic portico, the masterfully rhythmic use of Corinthian columns and pilasters, the subtle integration of upper and lower storeys and the independent counterpoint of friezes and cornices all exemplify Fontana's youthful manner, working in the organic Baroque that would be replaced by his later restrained academic Baroque. The conventional scrolls that ordinarily flank the upper central section are appropriately replaced with the martyr's palms.
Church of Santa Maria dei Miracoli, in collaboration with Gian Lorenzo Bernini (1662–79).
Church of San Biagio in Campitelli (1655).
Basilica di San Clemente, 1713–19. Restorations.
Interior of Basilica dei Santi Apostoli (1702–08).
The fountain in the left of the Piazza San Pietro (1675).
The fountain in front of Santa Maria in Trastevere, one of the oldest fountains of Rome, was restored by Fontana
The Cybo Chapel in Santa Maria del Popolo (1682–87).
Sistine Chapel in Santa Maria Maggiore (1671).
Ginetti Chapel in Sant'Andrea della Valle (1671).
Albani Chapel in San Sebastiano fuori le mura (1705).
Biblioteca Casanatense at Santa Maria sopra Minerva (1708). Fontana's magnificent salone houses the library that was donated by Cardinal Casanate in 1698. The library was opened in 1725 .
The great complex of San Michele a Ripa, with Mattia de' Rossi. The Chiesa Grande dates from 1706.
Baptismal font, St. Peter's Basilica (1692–1698).
The tombs of Popes Clement XI and Innocent XII.
The tomb of Queen Christina of Sweden in St. Peter's Basilica (1702).
 Villa Cetinale in Tuscany.

References

This article incorporates text from the 1913 Catholic Encyclopedia article "Carlo Fontana" by Thomas H. Poole, a publication now in the public domain.
Carlo, Fontana, ''Discorso... sopra il Monte Citatorio... (Rome 1694); facsimile (in Italian)

Italian Baroque architects
1630s births
1714 deaths
Architects from Ticino
Baroque architecture in Rome
Italian Baroque people
Italian male sculptors
17th-century Italian architects
18th-century Italian architects
17th-century Italian sculptors
18th-century Italian sculptors
18th-century Italian male artists